E. J. Underwood (born August 4, 1983) is a former American football defensive back.

Early life
As a prep, E.J. attended Hamilton High School. His football abilities were so good that he received a 4-star prospect rating according to Rivals.com. He received NCAA Division I scholarship offers from Georgia Tech, Minnesota, Ohio State, Penn State, and Pittsburgh.

College career

Ohio State
He played college football at Ohio State. He was a member of the 2002 NCAA National Championship team that defeated Miami (FL) in the national title game.

Pikeville
For his senior season, E.J. transferred to the University of Pikeville in Pikeville, Kentucky. Pikeville is an NAIA Institution. At the time, they were ranked 7th in the nation. The Bears finished 7-3 that season.

Professional career

New York Giants

He was signed by the New York Giants as an undrafted free agent in 2006 and spent the entire season on the team's injured reserve list due to an injured shoulder.

In 2007, he was once again injured in the preseason, this time with a broken jaw. He was later released.

New York Jets
Two days after his Giants release, Underwood was a member of the New York Jets' practice squad. He was released a little over a month later.

Buffalo Bills

In December, he was signed by the Buffalo Bills and added to their practice squad for the remainder of the season.

The next year the Bills re-signed Underwood, but later released him.

Cleveland Gladiators

In 2008, he played for the Cleveland Gladiators of Arena Football League.

And again in 2010, he was a member of the team, but was released after 2 months, and did not see any playing time.

Edmonton Eskimos
In 2009, Underwood signed to play with the Edmonton Eskimos of the Canadian Football League.

Cincinnati Commandos

After his release from the Gladiators, Underwood signed with the Cincinnati Commandos of the Continental Indoor Football League. The Commandos went 9-1 in the regular season, and Underwood went on to win 1st Team All-CIFL honors as a defensive back. The Commandos went on to win the CIFL Championship Game, with a 54-40 win over the Wisconsin Wolfpack.

E. J. re-signed with the Commandos for the 2012 season, as the team transferred into the United Indoor Football League.

Texas Revolution
For the 2013 season, Underwood signed with the Texas Revolution.

Marion Blue Racers
Underwood agreed to play for the Marion Blue Racers in 2014.

References

1983 births
Living people
Players of American football from Cincinnati
Players of Canadian football from Cincinnati
American football cornerbacks
Canadian football defensive backs
American players of Canadian football
Ohio State Buckeyes football players
University of Pikeville alumni
New York Giants players
New York Jets players
Buffalo Bills players
Edmonton Elks players
Cleveland Gladiators players
Cincinnati Commandos players
Texas Revolution players
Marion Blue Racers players